Broomhill is a community in the Municipality of Two Borders, Manitoba, Canada. The community is located on Highway 345 between the communities of Tilston and Bede, approximately 124 km south-west of Brandon, Manitoba only 25 km north-west of the Town of Melita. The town was named for the abundance of Broom plants that were seen growing on the sandhills in the area.  This area is commonly known for its rare mix of grasslands and wildlife.

Infrastructure

Broomhill was served by the Canadian Pacific Railway on its Alida subdivision until a storm in the spring of 1976 washed out the bridge over the Souris River near Lauder Manitoba.  The bridge was never repaired and the line was salvaged beginning in 1978, as well as Manitoba Highway 345.

See also

 List of communities in Manitoba

References

Localities in Manitoba
Unincorporated communities in Westman Region